The monuments list is taken from the Ghana Museums and Monuments Board, according to their description "legal custodian of Ghana's material cultural heritage (movable and immovable heritage)" GMMB classifies the monuments:

The ID used on this page in reference to the Regions of Ghana are based on the ISO Regional ID standards.

A. Western Region

|}

B. Central Region

|}

C. Greater Accra Region

|}

E. Volta Region

|}

F. Ashanti Region

|}

G. Northern Region

|}

H. Upper East

|}

hI. Upper West

|}

Archeological Sites
The Museum of Archeology, University of Ghana is listed on the QMMB site.

References

Heritage registers in Ghana
Wiki Loves Monuments